Hans Gerschwiler (21 June 1920 – 27 September 2017) was a Swiss figure skater. He was the 1948 Olympic silver medalist

Career 
Gerschwiler made his international debut at the 1939 European Championships, where he placed 5th. Between 1939 and 1947, no international skating competitions were held, due to World War II. Gerschwiler had been living in England with his uncle and coach Jacques Gerschwiler when the war broke out. When his uncle was called home to Switzerland, Gerschwiler stayed with Cecilia Colledge's family. He spent the war years working as a factory worker and fire watcher and was able to practice skating only once a week.

Following the War, Gerschwiler emerged as one of the dominant skaters of the time.

Gerschwiler won the 1947 World Figure Skating Championships and European Figure Skating Championships. He also won the silver medal at the 1948 Winter Olympics in St. Moritz and came in second at the 1948 European Championships, both time finishing behind Dick Button. He was coached by his uncle Arnold Gerschwiler.

Gerschwiler was considered to be a beautiful free-skater and one of the best school-skaters in the world at the time. He turned professional after the 1948 Winter Olympics.

Until Stéphane Lambiel won his first world title in 2005, Gerschwiler was the only Swiss man ever to have been World Champion. He and Lambiel are the only Swiss figure skaters ever to have won a silver medal at the Olympics. The only other Swiss skater to medal at the Olympics was Georges Gautschi who won bronze in 1924. Following Lambiel's win in 2005, Gerschwiler sent him a congratulatory message.

Results

References

 Skatabase: 1930s Europeans
 Skatabase: 1940s Europeans
 Skatabase: 1940s Worlds
 Skatabase: 1948 Olympics
 Hans Gerschwiler's obituary

1921 births
2017 deaths
Swiss male single skaters
Figure skaters at the 1948 Winter Olympics
Olympic figure skaters of Switzerland
Olympic silver medalists for Switzerland
Olympic medalists in figure skating
World Figure Skating Championships medalists
European Figure Skating Championships medalists
Medalists at the 1948 Winter Olympics
People from Winterthur
Sportspeople from the canton of Zürich